Cart Road is a census town in the Kurseong CD block in the Kurseong subdivision of the Darjeeling district  in the state of West Bengal, India.

Geography

Location

Area overview
The map alongside shows the eastern portion of the Darjeeling Himalayan hill region and a small portion of the terai region in its eastern and southern fringes, all of it in the Darjeeling district. In the Darjeeling Sadar subdivision 61.00% of the total population lives in the rural areas and 39.00% of the population lives in the urban areas. In the Kurseong subdivision 58.41% of the total population lives in the rural areas and 41.59% lives in the urban areas. There are 78 tea gardens/ estates (the figure varies slightly according to different sources), in the district, producing and largely exporting Darjeeling tea. It engages a large proportion of the population directly/ indirectly. Some tea gardens were identified in the 2011 census as census towns or villages. Such places are marked in the map as CT (census town) or R (rural/ urban centre). Specific tea estate pages are marked TE.

Note: The map alongside presents some of the notable locations in the subdivision. All places marked in the map are linked in the larger full screen map.

Demographics
According to the 2011 Census of India, Cart Road had a total population of 14,444 of which 7,116 (49%) were males and 7,328 (51%) were females. There were 1,085 persons in the age range of 0 to 6 years. The total number of literate people in Cart Road was 11,976 (82.91% of the population over 6 years).

 India census, Cart Road had a population of 13,701. Males constitute 50% of the population and females 50%. Cart Road has an average literacy rate of 79%, higher than the national average of 59.5%; with male literacy of 85% and female literacy of 72%. 9% of the population is under 6 years of age.

Infrastructure
According to the District Census Handbook 2011, Darjiling, Cart Road covered an area of 17.99 km2. Among the civic amenities, it had domestic electric connections. Among the educational facilities it had were 12 primary schools, 4 middle schools, 2 senior secondary schools,1 degree college. Among the social, recreational and cultural facilities it had 1 orphanage home, 4 public libraries. An important commodity it manufactured was tea. It had the branches of 2 nationalised banks and 1 agricultural credit society.

References

External links
 

Cities and towns in Darjeeling district